Sophon Ratanakorn (15 April 1931 – 30 September 2018) was a former president of the Supreme Court of Thailand, serving from 1990 to 1991.

Born in Chumphon, he was educated at Thammasat University (LLB, 1952) and King's College London (LLM, 1965).

References

1931 births
2018 deaths
Sophon Ratanakorn
Alumni of King's College London
Members of Gray's Inn
Sophon Ratanakorn
Sophon Ratanakorn